2004 Incomparable Concert is the second live album by Taiwanese singer Jay Chou, released as of 21 January 2005 by Sony Music Taiwan and included a date filmed at Taipei Municipal Stadium on 2 October 2004 from the 2004 Incomparable Concert.

Track listing
 "In Father's Name" (以父之名) – 5:59
 "The Wound That Ends War" (止戰之殤) – 4:37
 "Her Eyelashes" (她的睫毛) – 3:50
 "Sunny Day" (晴天) – 4:58
 "You Can Hear it" (妳聽得到) – 3:49
 "Terrace Field" (梯田) / "Dad, I've Come Back" (爸，我回來了) – 4:36
 "Fun Fair" (園遊會) – 4:18
 "Tornado" (龍捲風) – 4:08
 "General" (將軍) – 3:01
 "Chaotic Dance" (亂舞春秋) – 4:35
 "Starry Mood" (星晴) / "Back to the Past" (回到過去) / "The Final Battle" (最後的戰役) / "Love Me, Don't Go" (愛我別走) – 12:41
 "My Territory" (我的地盤) – 3:59
 "The Cliff of Love" (愛情懸崖) – 4:22
 "Step Aside" (擱淺) – 4:21
 "Excuse" (藉口) – 4:21
 "Break Up" (瓦解) – 3:36
 "Double Blade" (雙刀) / "Nunchucks" (雙截棍) / "Dragon Fist" (龍拳) – 6:59
 "Struggle" (困獸之鬥) – 4:23
 "Rewind" (倒帶) – 4:36
 "Simple Love" (簡單愛) – 6:33
 "Common Jasmine Orange" (七里香) – 5:02
 "Grandma" (外婆) – 4:18
 "Broken String" (斷了的弦) – 4:50
 "East Wind Breaks" (東風破) – 5:14
 "Orbit" (軌跡) – 6:34
Bonus MVs
 "My Territory" (我的地盤) 
 "Common Jasmine Orange" (七里香) 
 "Excuse" (藉口) 
 "Grandma" (外婆) 
 "General" (將軍) 
 "Step Aside" (擱淺) 
 "Chaotic Dance" (亂舞春秋) 
 "Struggle" (困獸之鬥) 
 "Fun Fair" (園遊會) 
 "The Wound That Ends War" (止戰之殤)

References

External links
  Jay Chou discography@JVR Music

2004 live albums
Jay Chou albums
Sony Music Taiwan albums